Trois Mec (“three guys”) was a 24 seat Michelin star French restaurant in Los Angeles. Ludo Lefebvre, Vinny Dotolo and Jon Shook opened the restaurant in 2013 but was closed in 2020 due to the COVID-19 pandemic. They were nominated for the James Beard Foundation Award Best New Restaurant in 2014. It was opened inside a former strip mall pizza place.

Tickets to dine on a five course meal were sold in the morning for just under $100.

See also
 List of French restaurants

References

External links
Trois Mec. Stirring the Pot in Fine Dining Harvard Business School case study

Defunct restaurants in Los Angeles
Michelin Guide starred restaurants in California
Defunct French restaurants in the United States
French restaurants in California